Shab-e-Barat, Barat Night, Cheragh e Barat, Berat Kandili, or Nisfu Syaaban (Southeastern Asian Muslims) is a cultural celebration celebrated in many South Asian, Central Asian, South East Asian and Middle Eastern Muslim countries, on the 15th night (the night on 15th only) of the month of Sha'ban, the eighth month of the Islamic calendar.

Description 
Some people mistake Shab-e-Barat festival as it is not a festival and Shia Mid-Sha'ban ceremony as they take place at the same time, but Shab-e-Barat's rituals and styles differ from region to region, while Mid-Sha'ban is celebrated the same everywhere. The observance of Barat involves a festive nightlong vigil with prayers. In most regions, it is a night when one's deceased ancestors are commemorated.

Shab-e-Barat is considered a major event in South East Asia, in which Muslims collectively worship and ask for forgiveness of their wrongdoings. It is believed to reward them with fortune for the whole year and cleanse them of their sins. In many regions, it is also a night when prayers are offered to forgive one's deceased ancestors. Additionally, Twelver Shia Muslims commemorate the birthday of Muhammad al-Mahdi. Imam Ja'far al-Sadiq and Imam Muhammad al-Baqir used to perform special prayers in this night. Both Sunni and Shia Muslims recognise this night to be as the Night of Forgiveness. Muslims observe Mid-Sha'ban as a night of worship and salvation. Scholars like Imam Shafii, Imam Nawawi, Imam Ghazzali, and Imam Suyuti have declared praying acceptable on the night of mid-Shaban.

Origins 
According to a study by Eiichi Imoto and Mohammad Ajam, Shab-e-Barat is rooted in pre-Islamic religions in the Middle East and Persia. Eastern Iranians traditionally preserve the Barat like the Bon Festival in Buddhism and Pitri Paksha in Hinduism and Zoroastrianism. The study states that the Persian word brat (bright) is different from the Arabic word bara'at. The Khorasan people call the Barat the Cheragh (light) Brat, meaning bright or light festival. Al-Biruni (973 – after 1050) had written about "a festival from 12 to 15 of the lunar month that in Arabic is Al Baiz meaning bright, and Barat also is called al Ceqe meaning Cheque." In some Iranian cities, people celebrate this festival by gathering in the cemeteries, lighting Peganum harmala (wild rue)—a holy plant in old Persia—placing the fire in a corner of the tombs, and pouring some salt on the fire while reading a poem saying: "The Peganum harmala is bitter and salt is salty so the jealous eye of the enemy be blind."

Shab-e-Barat is also known as the Night of Forgiveness or Day of Atonement. Muslims observe Mid-Sha'ban as a night of worship and salvation. Scholars like Imam Shafii, Imam Nawawi, Imam Ghazzali, and Imam Suyuti have declared praying acceptable on the night of mid-Shaban. In his Majmu', Imam Nawawi quoted Imam al-Shafi'i's Kitab al-Umm that there are five nights when dua (prayer) is answered, one of them being the night of the 15th of Sha`ban.

Etymology 

Shab-e-Barat is celebrated by Muslims all over the world. Some Muslims believe that on the night of Shab-e-Barat, God writes the destinies of all men and women for the coming year by taking into account the deeds they committed in the past. It is of high value to Sunni Muslims, and is regarded as one of the holiest nights on the Islamic calendar.

Significance and traditions 
To pray for the dead and ask God for the forgiveness of the dead is a common ceremony in all cities that hold Barat ceremonies. According to a hadith tradition, Muhammad(PBUH) went into the graveyard of Baqi' on this night, where he prayed for the Muslims buried there and never repeated again on this night. On this basis, some clerics deem it advisable on this night to go to the graveyard of the Muslims to recite part of the Qur'an and pray for the dead.

According to some Sunni Islam traditions, this night is called Shab-e-Bara'at because Allah frees those who are destined for Hell.

Customs in different countries 
This occasion is celebrated all over South and Central Asia. In the Arab world, the festival is celebrated by Sufi and Shia Muslims. Salafi Arabs do not celebrate this holiday.

Iran 

The Barat festival in Khorasan, especially in the Greater Khorasan region, Kurdistan, and parts of Iran, is one of the most important festivals for respecting the souls of the dead. People in every area have their own customs, but the common tradition is to prepare sweets and candy with dates (Halva) and Date palm. before sunset Groups gather in cemeteries to clean the tombs to place offerings of sweets and candy pot on the tombs for the departed to eat, to pray, and to light candles to turn on the lights (cherag). In some Iranian cities, to celebrate this festival people gather in the cemeteries to burn Peganum harmala or haoma (wild rue) in a corner of the tombs and pour some salt on the fire, and recite a poem saying: the Peganum harmala is bitter and salt is salty so the jealous eye of the enemy be blind. In Iran, the Barat festival is celebrated in two different ceremonies. in the recent century  On the day of 15th,which is a national holiday all city streets are lit to commemorate the birth date of Imam Al Mahdi, the last imam of Shia. but shab barat festival have a long history."

Iraq 
In Iraq, people give children candies as they walk through their neighborhoods. Sunni Muslims in Iraqi Kurdistan and Afghanistan celebrate this holiday 15 days before Ramadan, so Muslims in Indonesia do communal dhikr devotions in mosques followed by a lecture (ceramah) led by an ustadz. This tradition is rarely followed in Indonesia, but it is widely followed in Aceh, West Sumatra, and South Kalimantan. In southern Asia, Muslims make sweets (especially halwa or zarda) to give to neighbors and the poor on the evening before the 15th of Sha’ban.

Bangladesh 
Shab-e-Barat is observed by Bangladeshi Muslims. Many schools remain closed on that day. Many people fast, pray after the Isha prayer, read the Quran, barter bread and sweets and donate to the impoverished on that day.

India 
Historically, Shab-e-Barat in India has been associated with fasting, visiting mosques, charity, and lighting lamps, candles, and fireworks. The Darul Uloom Deoband seminary in India has opined that individual worship on the night of 15th Shaban is mustahab (virtuous) but practices such as lighting bulbs, preparing a variety of dishes, wearing new clothes, making halwa and collective worship in mosques are bid'ah (innovation) and should be avoided.
People belonging to the Muslim community of India pray all night and also recite the Quran. They start their prayers after sundown with the Isha Ki Namaz(night prayer). On the next day down, before azaan, sehri is eaten. Devotees also believe that Shab-e-Barat is the night when God decides the fortunes of people.  Some wishes that are shared on the occasion: Mubarak ho aap ko Shab-e-Barat. On this day, may Allah's mercy, blessing, benefit, pardon and forgiveness descend upon the people of earth.

Pakistan 
Shab-e-Barat is observed throughout Pakistan, and is an optional holiday that can be chosen from employment and holiday laws in Pakistan. Some employees may choose to take this day off, though most offices and businesses remain open.

Traditional sweets like halwa, savaiyyan (vermicelli) and flatbread are prepared and shared with neighbours, friends and relatives, and the poor.

Flowers are also placed on graves of deceased family members besides offering Fatiha for them.

In various places, it is a common tradition to offer prayers to Allah for forgiveness on behalf of the deceased, which is why people visit the graves of their loved ones, offer prayers and light candles and scent sticks at the graves of their loved ones.

The Ulema and religious scholars in their sermons highlight teachings of Islam while different gatherings and Mahafil-e-Naat are arranged to mark the holy night.

The houses, streets and mosques are decorated with colourful pennants and buntings.

Turkey 
Berat Kandili is the name for Mid-Sha’ban and it is considered a sacred day in Turkey. Muslim holiday celebrations have been called Kandil (oil lamp) since Sultan Selim II of the Ottoman Empire after burning lamps to light up minarets on the occasion of special blessed nights.

Shab-e-Barat in Japan 
Shab e Barat in Japan is an important ceremony for Muslims of Japan. In Islam, there are several Islamic events that have their own significance. However, Shab e Barat is also among the holiest event in Islam. Each year, Muslims in Japan do special arrangements regarding the event. They eagerly wait for the moon sighting to be aware about the confirmed date of Shab e Barat in Japan and to plan their activities accordingly.

See also 
 Mid-Sha'ban
Baraat
 Bon Festival
 Pitri Paksha
 Sufism

References

External links 

 Origin of Cherag (light) e Brat in Khorasan 
 Celebration of Shab-e-Barat 

Eid (Islam)
Islamic holy days
Shia days of remembrance
 
Sufism in India
Sufism
Buddhist holidays
Observances honoring the dead
Mahdism
Buddhism and Islam